Fedida is a surname. Notable people with the surname include:

Barbara Fedida, American media executive
Samuel Fedida (1918–2007), Egyptian-born British telecommunication engineer